Hal Lieberman is an American producer and former president of production for Universal Pictures.

Born and raised in Bronx, New York, Lieberman has a B.A. from SUNY at Stony Brook and an M.A. from the University of Chicago.

Lieberman began his career as Warren Beatty's production assistant on Heaven Can Wait, and spent the next eight years as a screenwriter. Tony Ganz and Deborah Blum hired him in 1986 to oversee development for their Disney-based Blum/Ganz Productions;  in 1987 he began his journey as a film executive at Universal Pictures, where he worked his way up the ranks to president in 1994.

As president of production at Universal, some of the movies Lieberman oversaw through development and production were Apollo 13, The Nutty Professor, Liar Liar, Fried Green Tomatoes, The River Wild, Death Becomes Her, Billy Madison, Happy Gilmore, Reality Bites, and Problem Child, amongst others.

As a producer, Lieberman's most recent film is House at the End of the Street, to be released in 2012 by Relativity Media and starring Jennifer Lawrence. Lieberman's other films include the critically acclaimed hit movie Bridge to Terabithia for Walt Disney Pictures, Vacancy for Sony Screen Gems and Vacancy 2: The First Cut for Sony's Stage 6, Terminator 3: Rise of the Machines, starring Arnold Schwarzenegger and Claire Danes, for Warner Brothers and Sony Pictures;  Around the World in 80 Days, starring Jackie Chan, Steve Coogan and Arnold Schwarzenegger; and served as executive producer on Universal Pictures' U-571 (starring Matthew McConaughey) and The Jackal (starring Bruce Willis and Richard Gere). In 2004, Lieberman signed a deal with Columbia.

Lieberman currently has multiple projects in progress, including Forever 21 for DreamWorks starring Elizabeth Banks, The Secret Lives of Road Crews (to be directed by Chris Columbus) for Paramount, The Umbra (to be directed by Joe Carnahan) for Endgame Entertainment, and The Applicant (to be directed by George Ratliff) for ATO Pictures.

Filmography 
He was a producer in all films unless otherwise noted.

Film

As an actor

References

External links 
 
Hal Lieberman to Lead LA Film Business Program
LA Film: Hal Lieberman, Director of the Entertainment Business Program Profile Page

LA Times Articles: Hal Lieberman
Yahoo! Movies: Hal Lieberman Details

Year of birth missing (living people)
Living people
American film producers
American film studio executives
American male screenwriters
People from the Bronx
Stony Brook University alumni
Universal Pictures
University of Chicago alumni
Screenwriters from New York (state)